Charlton Park is a public park in Charlton, in south-east London, in the Royal Borough of Greenwich. It is situated east of Charlton village and Charlton House, and south of Charlton Park Road (the B210, linking Woolwich and Blackheath). Cemetery Lane bordering Charlton cemetery lies to the east, and the park is north of the Queen Elizabeth Hospital.

The park has a floodlit all-weather sports pitch, a cricket pitch, and several grass pitches for football and rugby. It also features an 'adiZone' outdoor gym (provided by Adidas to host boroughs of the 2012 Summer Olympics), a skatepark, a playground with integrated access for wheelchair users, toilet facilities and a small cafe, the Old Cottage Coffee Shop Cafe (there are also toilets and a cafeteria in Charlton House). In October 2021, Charlton park hosted its first weekly parkrun.

The park is also used for occasional festivals and other events; in June 2022, for example, it hosted a Platinum Picnic in the Park to mark the Queen's Platinum Jubilee.

A Japanese-style herb garden and a pond garden are provided for visitors with visual or physical disabilities. South-east of Charlton House are two walled gardens, one of which was opened in July 2006 as a Peace Garden, in conjunction with Amnesty International.

The adjacent Charlton Park Academy (a special school for students aged 11–19, with low incidence special educational needs) takes its name from the Park.

References

Parks and open spaces in the Royal Borough of Greenwich
Charlton, London